Ali Mohammad Ranjbar (born in 1943, died on July 3, 2021) was an Iranian professor of electrical engineering and former chancellor of Sharif University of Technology.

Ranjbar received the MSc and PhD degrees in Electrical Engineering from University of Tehran in 1967 and Imperial College London in 1975, respectively with a thesis titled "Computer protection of high voltage transmission lines.". Since then, he was at Sharif University of Technology Department of Electrical Engineering, where he was a full professor. Ranjbar was the Editor-in-Chief of the Journal of Electrical Science and Technology since 1989 and the Director of Niroo Research Institute since 1996 too. His main research interests were in the areas of electric power systems protection and operation, Electrical Machines and Smart Grids.

References

External links
 Profile at SUT website

Alumni of Imperial College London
University of Tehran alumni
Academic staff of Sharif University of Technology
Living people
1943 births
Chancellors of the Sharif University of Technology
Iranian Science and Culture Hall of Fame recipients in Engineering